John Grieve (14 June 1924 – 21 January 2003) was a Scottish actor, best known as the engineer Macphail in the 1960s BBC adaptation of Neil Munro's Para Handy stories, Para Handy - Master Mariner (reprised in the 1970s in The Vital Spark).

Born in Maryhill, Glasgow, Grieve attended the Royal Scottish Academy of Music and Drama, before joining the Citizens Theatre in 1951. Grieve worked in variety alongside many familiar Scottish comedians, including Stanley Baxter and Jimmy Logan. Although principally known for his comic roles, he appeared in drama films such as The Thirty-Nine Steps (1978), Eye of the Needle (1981) and the BBC docudrama Square Mile of Murder (1980). His stage roles include the part of the King's Jester in the premier of The Burning (1971) by Stewart Conn.

He had a brief recurring role as Frank Marker's probation officer in the Thames Television series Public Eye.  He played Sandy Duncanson in BBC's adaptation of Neil Munro's The New Road, in a BBC drama about the Union of the Parliaments in 1707 he played John Hamilton, 2nd Lord Belhaven and Stenton who delivered a controversial speech against the Union, and appeared on BBC Scotland's Hogmanay celebrations,  one of which (Into '85) was broadcast nationally from Gleneagles and became notorious for Grieve, apparently worse the wear with alcohol, unable to recite a brief poem and collapsing into laughter, along with other shambolic incidents featured in the same programme. The BBC as a result did not broadcast Hogmanay-themed programmes from the following year.

He appeared in two episodes (eleven years apart) in the television series All Creatures Great and Small as Dr. Harry Allinson, whose practice was next door to Skeldale House.

Filmography

References

External links

 Obituary John Grieve, The Scotsman, 28 January 2003

1924 births
2003 deaths
Male actors from Glasgow
Scottish male television actors
Scottish male stage actors
Alumni of the Royal Conservatoire of Scotland